Caldermeade is a bounded rural locality in Victoria, Australia,  south-east of Melbourne's central business district, located within the Shire of Cardinia local government area. Caldermeade recorded a population of 181 at the 2021 census.

History

Caldermeade Post Office opened on 14 January 1901 and closed in 1967.

A railway station was located here from 1890 until the 1960s on the South Gippsland railway line.

See also
 City of Cranbourne – Caldermeade was previously within this former local government area.

References

Shire of Cardinia